Robert W. Wiley is a Republican United States politician from Rockingham County, New Hampshire
.

Wiley served 2 terms (2002–2006) as a member of the New Hampshire House of Representatives, where he represented Derry.

References

1963 births
Living people
Republican Party members of the New Hampshire House of Representatives
People from Derry, New Hampshire